Simon Stiell is a Grenadian politician, serving as the executive secretary of the United Nations Framework Convention on Climate Change since August 2022. He previously served as Grenada's environment, education, and human resources minister.

Career
Stiell is an engineer and studied a MBA at the University of Westminster. Prior to his political career, he worked in the technology sector for 14 years outside Grenada. He worked for Nokia and GEC Plessey Telecommunications. Stiell moved back to Grenada after his technology career and established a property development company. He also chaired the country's tourism board and chamber of commerce.

Political career
In 2013, Stiell was appointed to the Senate of Grenada, as a member of the New National Party. He served as a junior minister for agriculture, environment, and human resources development. From 2017 to 2018, Stiell was the cabinet minister of education and human resources development. In March 2018, he was appointed as the country's environment and climate resilience minister. Stiell continued until June 2022, when his New National Party lost a general election.

References

Living people
21st-century Grenadian politicians
Year of birth missing (living people)